Thomas Frankson (September 16, 1869 – June 8, 1939) was born in York Township, Minnesota.  He was the 22nd Lieutenant Governor of Minnesota from 1917 to 1921. Frankson was a lawyer, real estate developer, and politician. He died June 8, 1939, in St. Paul, Minnesota.

Frankson lived in Spring Valley, Minnesota before moving to St. Paul, where he developed land under the company name, Frankson's Land Agency, and raised bison. He built a home at 1349 Midway Parkway on the Western border of Como Park in St. Paul that is referred to as the Thomas Frankson House today. He raised bison in a private buffalo pasture a few blocks West of his home near what is now Bison Street and Holy Childhood Catholic Church and School. The street to the North of Midway Parkway was named after him.

Frankson spent about $30,000 campaigning for the Republican nomination for Lieutenant Governor.

Frankson was married to Hannah Inglebret.

In 1915, Frankson donated two bison to the Como Zoo and Conservatory.

References
Minnesota Historical Society
Minnesota Legislators Past and Present

1869 births
1939 deaths
Lieutenant Governors of Minnesota
People from Fillmore County, Minnesota
Republican Party members of the Minnesota House of Representatives
Politicians from Saint Paul, Minnesota
People from Spring Valley, Minnesota